The Real Housewives of Lagos  (abbreviated RHOLagos) is a Nigerian reality television series that premiered on 8 April 2022, on Showmax, starring Carolyna Hutchings, Laura Ikeji, Chioma Ikokwu, Toyin Lawani-Adebayo, Iyabo Ojo, and Mariam Timmer. The show focused on the luxury lives in the Lagos socialites, from shopping sprees, parties, traveling, and competition within their social circles.

The Real Housewives of Lagos is a spin-off from The Real Housewives series franchise and produced by Livespot 360.

Overview & casting

Carolyna Hutchings

Carolyna Hutchings is the CEO of a real estate, agriculture, oil and gas company, and a mother of three.

Laura Ikeji

Laura Ikeji-Kanu is a social media influencer, author, and entrepreneur. She is a mother of two, and she's married to Christopher Kanu.

Chioma Ikokwu

Chioma Ikokwu is a lawyer, co-founder and CEO of luxury hair brand Good Hair Woman and Brass, and Copper Restaurant & Lounge. She also runs women- and children-focused charity called the Goodway Foundation.

Toyin Lawani-Adebayo
Toyin Lawani-Adebayo is a renowned celebrity stylist, fashion designer, business mogul and CEO of Tiannah’s Place Empire. She is a mother-of-three and she's married to Segun Wealth.

Iyabo Ojo

Iyabo Ojo is a famous Nollywood actress, producer, brand influencer, entrepreneur and CEO of Fepris Limited. She is divorced and a mother-of-two.

Mariam Timmer
Mariam Timmer is a PR expert and chief executive director at Six Sixteen Agency.

Series overview

Episodes

Season 1 (2022)

Production
The reality television series was produced by Livespot 360, and distributed by NBCUniversal Formats, a division of Universal Studio Group. On 13 January 2022, Showmax Stories shared an hint about the series, and introduced its cast.  On 16 March 2022, the official trailer was released on Showmax YouTube channel.

Reception

Awards and nominations

References

External links
 The Real Housewives of Lagos at Showmax

Lagos
Women in Nigeria
2022 Nigerian television series debuts
Nigerian reality television series
Culture in Lagos State
English-language Showmax original programming
Television shows set in Lagos